The year 2003 is the 11th year in the history of the Ultimate Fighting Championship (UFC), a mixed martial arts promotion based in the United States. In 2003, the UFC held five events beginning with UFC 41: Onslaught.

Title fights

Debut UFC fighters

The following fighters fought their first UFC fight in 2003:

 Chris Liguori
 Dave Strasser
 David Loiseau
 Duane Ludwig
 Eddie Ruiz
 Edwin Dewees
 Falaniko Vitale
 Frank Trigg

 Gerald Strebendt
 Hermes Franca
 Jeremy Jackson
 Jorge Rivera
 Josh Thomson
 Karo Parisyan
 Marvin Eastman
 Nick Agallar

 Nick Diaz
 Rich Clementi
 Rich Crunkilton
 Rich Franklin
 Romie Aram
 Sean Alvarez
 Vernon White
 Wes Sims

Events list

See also
 UFC
 List of UFC champions
 List of UFC events

References

Ultimate Fighting Championship by year
2003 in mixed martial arts